The 2014 Kansas gubernatorial election took place on November 4, 2014, to elect the Governor of Kansas, concurrently with the election of Kansas' Class II U.S. Senate seat, as well as other elections to the United States Senate in other states and elections to the United States House of Representatives and various state and local elections.

Incumbent Republican Governor Sam Brownback ran for re-election to a second term. He was opposed in the general election by Democrat Paul Davis, the Minority Leader of the Kansas House of Representatives, and Libertarian attorney Keen Umbehr.

The election was viewed as a referendum on Brownback's aggressive tax cutting initiatives and his conservative values. The consensus among The Cook Political Report, Governing, The Rothenberg Political Report, Sabato's Crystal Ball, Daily Kos Elections, and others was that the contest was a tossup. Brownback won the election by a margin of 3.7%. Davis carried seven counties, all in eastern Kansas, five of which are home to four-year state universities. This is was also the last gubernatorial election in which a Democratic candidate won Jefferson County.

Republican primary

Candidates

Declared
 Sam Brownback, incumbent Governor
Running mate: Jeff Colyer, incumbent Lieutenant Governor
 Jennifer Winn, businesswoman
Running mate: Robin Lais, advertising agency owner and natural healing shop owner
Former running mate: Ethan McCord, Iraq War veteran

Declined
 Kris Kobach, Secretary of State of Kansas (running for re-election)
 Steve Morris, former President of the Kansas Senate
 Sandy Praeger, Kansas Insurance Commissioner (endorsed Paul Davis)

Polling

Results

Democratic primary

Candidates

Declared
 Paul Davis, Minority Leader of the Kansas House of Representatives
Running mate: Jill Docking, businesswoman, former member of the Kansas Board of Regents and nominee for the U.S. Senate in 1996 (running for Lieutenant Governor)

Declined
 Carl Brewer, mayor of Wichita
 Jill Docking
 Tom Holland, state senator and nominee for governor in 2010
 Deb Miller, former secretary of the Kansas Department of Transportation
 Stephen Morris, former Republican President of the Kansas Senate
 Mark Parkinson, former governor, president and CEO of the American Health Care Association and the National Center for Assisted Living
 Sandy Praeger, Republican Kansas Insurance Commissioner
 Joe Reardon, former mayor of Kansas City
 Joshua Svaty, vice president of The Land Institute and former Secretary of Agriculture of Kansas

Results

Libertarian nomination

Candidates

Declared
 Keen Umbehr, attorney
Running mate: Josh Umbehr, physician and son of Keen Umbehr

General election

Debates
Complete video of debate, September 6, 2014 - C-SPAN
Complete video of debate, October 21, 2014 - C-SPAN

Endorsements

Predictions

Polling

Results

References

External links
 
 Sam Brownback for Governor
 Paul Davis for Governor
 Tresa McAlhaney for Governor
 Keen Umbehr for Governor
 Jennifer Winn for Governor

Gubernatorial
2014
2014 United States gubernatorial elections